Matthew Guy Charles Chambers (born 20 August 1968) is an English actor, known for portraying the role of Daniel Granger in the BBC soap opera Doctors.

Early and personal life
Matthew Guy Charles Chambers was born in London on 20 August 1968, and has one brother. Chambers and wife, Aisha, have two daughters, Maya and Ines.

Career
Chambers began his television career in 2003 with a main role in the Sky One series Mile High. Later that year, he appeared in the television film Final Demand and an episode of the BBC medical drama Holby City. He then made appearances in television series such as As If, Family Affairs, and Doctor Who, in the episode "42". He then had a role in an adaptation of Lady Godiva, which was released in 2008. Since 9 July 2007, Chambers has portrayed the role of Daniel Granger in the BBC daytime soap opera Doctors. Chambers has also directed 18 episodes of Doctors.

Filmography

Awards and nominations

References

External links
 

1968 births
21st-century English male actors
Alumni of the Webber Douglas Academy of Dramatic Art
English male film actors
English male soap opera actors
English television directors
Living people
Male actors from London